The 1997 Southend-on-Sea Council election took place on 1 May 1997 to elect members of Southend-on-Sea Unitary Council in Essex, England. The whole council was up for election, although the ward boundaries remained the same.

Results summary

Ward results

Belfairs

Blenheim

Chalkwell

Eastwood

Leigh

Milton

Prittlewell

Shoebury

Southchurch

St. Luke's

Thorpe

Victoria

Westborough

References

1997
1997 English local elections
1990s in Essex